The V-Cube 6 is a 6×6×6 version of the original Rubik's Cube. The first mass-produced 6×6×6 was invented by Panagiotis Verdes and is produced by the Greek company Verdes Innovations SA. Other such puzzles have since been introduced by a number of Chinese companies, most of which have mechanisms which improve on the original. Unlike the original puzzle (but like the 4×4×4 cube), it has no fixed facets: the center facets (16 per face) are free to move to different positions. 

Methods for solving the 3×3×3 cube work for the edges and corners of the 6×6×6 cube, as long as one has correctly identified the relative positions of the colors — since the center facets can no longer be used for identification.

Mechanics 

The puzzle consists of 152 pieces ("cubies") on the surface. There are also 66 pieces (60 movable, 6 fixed, and a central "spider" frame) entirely hidden within the interior of the cube. The V-Cube 7 uses essentially the same mechanism, except that on the latter these hidden pieces (corresponding to the center rows) are made visible.

There are 96 center pieces which show one color each, 48 edge pieces which show two colors each, and eight corner pieces which show three colors. Each piece (or quartet of edge pieces) shows a unique color combination, but not all combinations are present (for example, there is no edge piece with both red and orange sides, since red and orange are on opposite sides of the solved Cube). The location of these cubes relative to one another can be altered by twisting the layers of the Cube 90°, 180° or 270°, but the location of the colored sides relative to one another in the completed state of the puzzle cannot be altered: it is fixed by the distribution of color combinations on the edge and corner pieces.

The V-Cube 6 is produced with white plastic as a base, with red opposite orange, blue opposite green, and yellow opposite black. One center piece is branded with the letter V. Verdes also sells a version with black plastic and a white face, with the other colors remaining the same.

Unlike the rounded V-Cube 7, the original V-Cube 6 has flat faces. However, the outermost pieces are slightly wider than those in the center. This subtle difference allows the use of a thicker stalk to hold the corner pieces to the internal mechanism, thus making the puzzle more durable. The V-Cube 6b, which has the same "pillowed" shape as the V-Cube 7, was introduced later.

Permutations

There are 8 corners, 48 edges and 96 centers.

Any permutation of the corners is possible, including odd permutations. Seven of the corners can be independently rotated, and the orientation of the eighth depends on the other seven, giving 8!×37 combinations.

There are 96 centers, consisting of four sets of 24 pieces each. Within each set there are four centers of each color. Centers from one set cannot be exchanged with those from another set. Each set can be arranged in 24! different ways. Assuming that the four centers of each color in each set are indistinguishable, the number of permutations is reduced to 24!/(246) arrangements. The reducing factor comes about because there are 24 (4!) ways to arrange the four pieces of a given color. This is raised to the sixth power because there are six colors. The total number of center permutations is the permutations of a single set raised to the fourth power, 24!4/(2424).

There are 48 edges, consisting of 24 inner and 24 outer edges. These cannot be flipped, due to the internal shape of the pieces, nor can an inner edge exchange places with an outer edge. The four edges in each matching quartet are distinguishable, since corresponding edges are mirror images of each other. Any permutation of the edges in each set is possible, including odd permutations, giving 24! arrangements for each set or 24!2 total, regardless of the position or orientation of any other pieces.

Assuming the cube does not have a fixed orientation in space, and that the permutations resulting from rotating the cube without twisting it are considered identical, the number of permutations is reduced by a factor of 24. This is because the 24 possible positions and orientations of the first corner are equivalent because of the lack of fixed centers. This factor does not appear when calculating the permutations of N×N×N cubes where N is odd, since those puzzles have fixed centers which identify the cube's spatial orientation.

This gives a total number of permutations of

The entire number is 157 152 858 401 024 063 281 013 959 519 483 771 508 510 790 313 968 742 344 694 684 829 502 629 887 168 573 442 107 637 760 000 000 000 000 000 000 000 000 (around 157 novemdecillion on the long scale or 157 septentrigintillion on the short scale).

One of the center pieces is marked with a V, which distinguishes it from the other three in its set. This increases the number of patterns by a factor of four to 6.29×10116, although any of the four possible positions for this piece could be regarded as correct.

Solutions
There are numerous ways to solve the V-Cube 6. Some of the popular ones are given below.

Reduction method
The reduction method is a popular method among the speedcubing community. The method starts off by solving the 96 face centers, making sure that colors are properly placed relative to each other. The next step involves matching up quartets of edge pieces into solid strips. At this point the cube is solved as if it were a very large 3×3×3 cube, with possible parity errors (described below) which cannot occur on the original 3×3×3 cube.

Yau method
The Yau method is another popular method. This has much in common with the reduction method, but involves performing some steps in a different order.

Cage method
The cage method differs in that the edges and corners are solved first. In some versions the centers of two opposite faces are solved prior to this. The final step entails moving the remaining center pieces to the proper faces.

Parity errors
Parity errors are positions that cannot be reached on the 3×3×3 Rubik's Cube. These have special algorithms to fix the parity. Such errors include having a single edge quartet "flipped," or having two edge quartets swapped.

World records
The world record fastest 6×6×6 solve is 59.74 seconds, set by Max Park of United States on 31 July 2022 at CubingUSA Southeast Championship 2022 in Gatlinburg, Tennessee.

The world record mean of three solves is 1 minute, 8.56 seconds, also set by Max Park at WCC Western Championship 2022 in Los Angeles, California, with the times of 1:11.79, 1:03.71 and 1:10.18.

Top 5 solvers by single solve using 6x6

Top 5 solvers by mean/average of 3 solves

See also
 Pocket Cube (2×2×2)
 Rubik's Cube (3×3×3)
 Rubik's Revenge (4×4×4)
 Professor's Cube (5×5×5)
 V-Cube 7 (7×7×7)
 V-Cube 8 (8×8×8)
 Combination puzzles

References

Further reading
 Rubik's Revenge: The Simplest Solution (Book) by William L. Mason

External links
 Verdes Innovations SA Official site.
 Frank Morris takes on the V-Cube 6
 United States V-CUBE distributor

Rubik's Cube